Nooravathu Naal is a 1984 Indian Tamil-language mystery thriller film written and directed by Manivannan. The film stars Vijayakanth, Mohan and Nalini, with Thengai Srinivasan, Janagaraj and Sathyaraj in supporting roles. It is an unofficial adaptation of the 1977 Italian giallo film Sette note in nero. The film was remade in Malayalam as Aayiram Kannukal (1986) and in Hindi as 100 Days (1991).

Plot 

Devi, a college student has a strange premonition one night of her sister being murdered. Her sister soon goes missing. After a few years, Devi meets and marries a rich businessman Ramkumar. Soon after, Devi has another vision of an unknown woman being murdered and seeks the help of her brother-in-law Raj to help her save the possible victim. Raj is reluctant to believe her story but assists her anyway. Devi also finds a decomposed body in the bungalow where she lives with Ramkumar, which she believes is her sister's based on her previous vision. Devi and Raj's investigations lead them to the museum where Devi's sister worked and a strange man who tries to assassinate them. Whether Devi's strange premonitions are true and whether she and Raj are able to trap the mysterious killer forms the rest of the story.

Cast 
 Vijayakanth as Raj
 Mohan as Ramkumar
 Nalini as Devi
 Thengai Srinivasan as Ramanathan
 Janagaraj as John
 Sathyaraj as Jayaraman
 Y. Vijaya as Parvathi
 Kovai Sarala as Manju
 Kokila as Sarasu

Production 
Nooravathu Naal was directed by Manivannan and produced by S. N. S. Thirumal under Thirupathisamy Pictures, with cinematography by A. Sabapathy. Manivannan selected Sathyaraj to portray a negative role. For the character look, he sported a clean-shaven pate, wore sunglasses and a red jerkin. He completed his portions within five days.

Soundtrack 
The music was composed by Ilaiyaraaja. The song "Vizhiyile Mani Vizhiyil" was re-used from the song "Jotheyali Jothe Jotheyali" from the 1981 Kannada film Geetha and further reused in the 2007 Hindi film Cheeni Kum as the song "Jaane Do Na". It is set in the Carnatic raga known as Kapi.

Release and reception 
Nooravathu Naal was released on 23 February 1984, and ran for over 200 days in theatres. Jayamanmadhan of Kalki wrote .

Legacy 
Sathyaraj's performance as a psychopathic killer received acclaim and made him popular among audiences. Nooravathu Naal became a milestone in Tamil cinema, with regards to "scene construction". The serial killers Auto Shankar and Jayaprakash were inspired by the film to commit murders. Sangeetha Devi Dundoo of The Hindu in her review of the Telugu film Tripura (2015) said that the idea of hiding corpses inside a wall is inspired from Nooravathu Naal.

References

Bibliography

External links 
 

1980s mystery thriller films
1980s Tamil-language films
1985 films
Films directed by Manivannan
Films scored by Ilaiyaraaja
Indian mystery thriller films
Indian remakes of Italian films
Tamil films remade in other languages